Ľudmila Cervanová (born 15 October 1979 in Piešťany, Czechoslovakia) is a retired tennis player from Slovakia. She turned professional in 1997, and reached career-high rankings of world No. 58 in singles in March 2004 and No. 186 in doubles in May 1997.

Biography
Cervanová graduated from high school in 1997, the same year she turned pro. Her favourite tennis court surface is clay, and her best shot is the backhand. She was coached by Jan Kuval.

Tennis career
Cervanová did not win any title on the WTA Tour. Her closest being in Acapulco, on 27 February 2005, when she lost in the final to Flavia Pennetta 6–3, 5–7, 3–6. She has also reached the final of the tournament in Casablanca in 2004, where she lost to Émilie Loit of France, 2–6, 2–6, the semifinals of Bratislava in 2001, where she lost to eventual winner Rita Grande from Italy, 3–6, 2–6, and the semifinals of Bogotá in 2006, losing to Lourdes Domínguez Lino 1–6, 3–6.

In her career, she won seven singles and seven doubles titles on the ITF Women's Circuit.

Cervanová has made little progress in each of the four Grand Slam tournaments, her best reaching the third round of Wimbledon in 2004, and the third round of the French Open in 2002.

WTA career finals

Singles: 2 (0–2)

ITF finals

Singles (7–4)

Doubles (7–9)

External links
 
 

1979 births
Living people
Slovak female tennis players
Sportspeople from Piešťany